This article is about the particular significance of the year 1773 to Wales and its people.

Incumbents
Lord Lieutenant of Anglesey - Sir Nicholas Bayly, 2nd Baronet
Lord Lieutenant of Brecknockshire and Monmouthshire – Charles Morgan of Dderw
Lord Lieutenant of Caernarvonshire - Thomas Wynn
Lord Lieutenant of Cardiganshire – Wilmot Vaughan, 1st Earl of Lisburne
Lord Lieutenant of Carmarthenshire – George Rice
Lord Lieutenant of Denbighshire - Richard Myddelton  
Lord Lieutenant of Flintshire - Sir Roger Mostyn, 5th Baronet 
Lord Lieutenant of Glamorgan – John Stuart, Lord Mountstuart
Lord Lieutenant of Merionethshire - William Vaughan
Lord Lieutenant of Montgomeryshire – Robert Clive (from 17 June)
Lord Lieutenant of Pembrokeshire – Sir William Owen, 4th Baronet
Lord Lieutenant of Radnorshire – Edward Harley, 4th Earl of Oxford and Earl Mortimer

Bishop of Bangor – John Ewer 
Bishop of Llandaff – Shute Barrington
Bishop of St Asaph – Jonathan Shipley
Bishop of St Davids – Charles Moss

Events
22 April - An earthquake occurs in the Caernarfon area, with an estimated strength of 3.7.
7 November - Richard Morris makes his will. 
25 November - Walter Siddons marries Sarah Kemble.
date unknown
Dolauhirion Bridge is built on the Llandovery to Cilycwm road by William Edwards.
David Williams, having resigned from the ministry, opens a school in Chelsea.

Arts and literature

New books
Evan Evans (Ieuan Fardd) - Rhybudd Cyfr-drist i'r Diofal a Difraw
John Roberts (Siôn Robert Lewis) - Geirlyfr Ysgrythurol

Music
James Rivington settles in New York, where he begins selling musical instruments, including "Welsh harps".

Births
21 February - Titus Lewis, preacher and writer (died 1811) 
21 April - Christopher Bethell, English clergyman, Bishop of Bangor 1830-1859 (died 1859)
14 November - Stapleton Stapleton-Cotton, 1st Viscount Combermere, military leader (died 1865)
date unknown
Catherine Davies, royal governess and memoirist (died c.1841)
Joseph Harris (Gomer), writer (died 1825)

Deaths
16 February - Sir John Wynn, 2nd Baronet, 71
21 July - Howell Harris, Methodist leader, 59

References

Wales
Wales